This is a list of trolleybus systems in Switzerland.  It includes all trolleybus systems, past and present.

Alphabetical list by principal city

Trolley freight
In addition to trolleybus systems, one trolley-freight (or trolleytruck) system existed, on a route between Mühleberg and Gümmenen, from 1918 to 1922. It had just two trolley-truck vehicles and was used during construction of a power station.

See also
 List of trolleybus systems, for all other countries
 List of town tramway systems in Switzerland
 List of light-rail transit systems
 List of rapid transit systems
 Trolleybus usage by country

Sources

Books and periodicals
 Murray, Alan. 2000. "World Trolleybus Encyclopaedia". Reading, Berkshire, UK: Trolleybooks.
 Dölling, Gerhard (Ed.). 1993. "Strassenbahnatlas Schweiz 1993" .  Berlin: Arbeitsgemeinschaft Blickpunkt Strassenbahn e.V. 
 Peschkes, Robert. 1993. "World Gazetteer of Tram, Trolleybus and Rapid Transit Systems, Part Three: Europe". London: Rapid Transit Publications.
 Trolleybus Magazine (ISSN 0266-7452). National Trolleybus Association (UK). Bimonthly.
 Blickpunkt Strassenbahn. Arbeitsgemeinschaft Blickpunkt Strassenbahn e.V. (Germany). Bimonthly.

References

External links

Switzerland
 
Trolleybus systems